Facundo Nahuel Carrillo (born 26 February 1997) is an Argentine professional footballer who plays as a forward.

Career
After a stint in the academy of Banfield, Carrillo started out his senior career with Nueva Chicago. Facundo Argüello moved the forward into the club's first-team during the 2017–18 Primera B Nacional, kicking off Carrillo's professional experience by selecting him on the bench for an encounter with Quilmes on 11 November 2017. Carrillo made his debut against Villa Dálmine later that month, prior to featuring in fixtures versus Gimnasia y Esgrima and Los Andes in December. He departed in 2018.

Career statistics
.

References

External links

1997 births
Living people
Sportspeople from Buenos Aires Province
Argentine footballers
Association football forwards
Primera Nacional players
Nueva Chicago footballers